General relativity, also known as the general theory of relativity and Einstein's theory of gravity, is the geometric theory of gravitation published by Albert Einstein in 1915 and is the current description of gravitation in modern physics. General relativity generalizes special relativity and refines Newton's law of universal gravitation, providing a unified description of gravity as a geometric property of space and time or four-dimensional spacetime. The relation is specified by the Einstein field equations, a system of second order partial differential equations.

Newton's law of universal gravitation, which describes classical gravity, can be seen as a prediction of general relativity for the almost flat spacetime geometry around stationary mass distributions. Some predictions of general relativity, however, are beyond Newton's law of universal gravitation in classical physics. These predictions concern the passage of time, the geometry of space, the motion of bodies in free fall, and the propagation of light, and include gravitational time dilation, gravitational lensing, the gravitational redshift of light, the Shapiro time delay and singularities/black holes. So far, all tests of general relativity have been shown to be in agreement with the theory. The time dependent solutions of general relativity enable us to talk about the history of the universe and have provided the modern framework for cosmology, thus leading to the discovery of the Big Bang and cosmic microwave background radiation. Despite the introduction of a number of alternative theories, general relativity continues to be the simplest theory consistent with experimental data.

Reconciliation of general relativity with the laws of quantum physics remains a problem, however, as there is a lack of a self-consistent theory of quantum gravity. It is not yet known how gravity can be unified with the three non-gravitational forces: strong, weak and electromagnetic.

Einstein's theory has astrophysical implications, including the prediction of black holes—regions of space in which space and time are distorted in such a way that nothing, not even light, can escape from them. Black holes are the end-state for massive stars. Microquasars and active galactic nuclei are believed to be stellar black holes and supermassive black holes. It also predicts gravitational lensing, where the bending of light results in multiple images of the same distant astronomical phenomenon. Other predictions include the existence of gravitational waves, which have been observed directly by the physics collaboration LIGO and other observatories. In addition, general relativity has provided the base of cosmological models of an expanding universe.

In the preface to Relativity: The Special and the General Theory, Einstein said "The present book is intended, as far as possible, to give an exact insight into the theory of Relativity to those readers who, from a general scientific and philosophical point of view, are interested in the theory, but who are not conversant with the mathematical apparatus of theoretical physics. The work presumes a standard of education corresponding to that of a university matriculation examination, and, despite the shortness of the book, a fair amount of patience and force of will on the part of the reader. The author has spared himself no pains in his endeavour to present the main ideas in the simplest and most intelligible form, and on the whole, in the sequence and connection in which they actually originated."

Widely acknowledged as a theory of extraordinary beauty, general relativity has often been described as the most beautiful of all existing physical theories.

History 

Soon after publishing the special theory of relativity in 1905, Einstein started thinking about how to incorporate gravity into his new relativistic framework. In 1907, beginning with a simple thought experiment involving an observer in free fall, he embarked on what would be an eight-year search for a relativistic theory of gravity. After numerous detours and false starts, his work culminated in the presentation to the Prussian Academy of Science in November 1915 of what are now known as the Einstein field equations, which form the core of Einstein's general theory of relativity. These equations specify how the geometry of space and time is influenced by whatever matter and radiation are present. A version of non-Euclidean geometry, called Riemannian Geometry, enabled Einstein to develop general relativity by providing the key mathematical framework on which he fit his physical ideas of gravity. This idea was pointed out by mathematician Marcel Grossmann and published by Grossmann and Einstein in 1913.

The Einstein field equations are nonlinear and considered difficult to solve. Einstein used approximation methods in working out initial predictions of the theory. But in 1916, the astrophysicist Karl Schwarzschild found the first non-trivial exact solution to the Einstein field equations, the Schwarzschild metric. This solution laid the groundwork for the description of the final stages of gravitational collapse, and the objects known today as black holes. In the same year, the first steps towards generalizing Schwarzschild's solution to electrically charged objects were taken, eventually resulting in the Reissner–Nordström solution, which is now associated with electrically charged black holes. In 1917, Einstein applied his theory to the universe as a whole, initiating the field of relativistic cosmology. In line with contemporary thinking, he assumed a static universe, adding a new parameter to his original field equations—the cosmological constant—to match that observational presumption. By 1929, however, the work of Hubble and others had shown that our universe is expanding. This is readily described by the expanding cosmological solutions found by Friedmann in 1922, which do not require a cosmological constant. Lemaître used these solutions to formulate the earliest version of the Big Bang models, in which our universe has evolved from an extremely hot and dense earlier state. Einstein later declared the cosmological constant the biggest blunder of his life.

During that period, general relativity remained something of a curiosity among physical theories. It was clearly superior to Newtonian gravity, being consistent with special relativity and accounting for several effects unexplained by the Newtonian theory. Einstein showed in 1915 how his theory explained the anomalous perihelion advance of the planet Mercury without any arbitrary parameters ("fudge factors"), and in 1919 an expedition led by Eddington confirmed general relativity's prediction for the deflection of starlight by the Sun during the total solar eclipse of 29 May 1919, instantly making Einstein famous. Yet the theory remained outside the mainstream of theoretical physics and astrophysics until developments between approximately 1960 and 1975, now known as the golden age of general relativity. Physicists began to understand the concept of a black hole, and to identify quasars as one of these objects' astrophysical manifestations. Ever more precise solar system tests confirmed the theory's predictive power, and relativistic cosmology also became amenable to direct observational tests.

General relativity has acquired a reputation as a theory of extraordinary beauty. Subrahmanyan Chandrasekhar has noted that at multiple levels, general relativity exhibits what Francis Bacon has termed a "strangeness in the proportion" (i.e. elements that excite wonderment and surprise). It juxtaposes fundamental concepts (space and time versus matter and motion) which had previously been considered as entirely independent. Chandrasekhar also noted that Einstein's only guides in his search for an exact theory were the principle of equivalence and his sense that a proper description of gravity should be geometrical at its basis, so that there was an "element of revelation" in the manner in which Einstein arrived at his theory. Other elements of beauty associated with the general theory of relativity are its simplicity and symmetry, the manner in which it incorporates invariance and unification, and its perfect logical consistency.

From classical mechanics to general relativity 
General relativity can be understood by examining its similarities with and departures from classical physics. The first step is the realization that classical mechanics and Newton's law of gravity admit a geometric description. The combination of this description with the laws of special relativity results in a heuristic derivation of general relativity.

Geometry of Newtonian gravity 

At the base of classical mechanics is the notion that a body's motion can be described as a combination of free (or inertial) motion, and deviations from this free motion. Such deviations are caused by external forces acting on a body in accordance with Newton's second law of motion, which states that the net force acting on a body is equal to that body's (inertial) mass multiplied by its acceleration. The preferred inertial motions are related to the geometry of space and time: in the standard reference frames of classical mechanics, objects in free motion move along straight lines at constant speed. In modern parlance, their paths are geodesics, straight world lines in curved spacetime.

Conversely, one might expect that inertial motions, once identified by observing the actual motions of bodies and making allowances for the external forces (such as electromagnetism or friction), can be used to define the geometry of space, as well as a time coordinate. However, there is an ambiguity once gravity comes into play. According to Newton's law of gravity, and independently verified by experiments such as that of Eötvös and its successors (see Eötvös experiment), there is a universality of free fall (also known as the weak equivalence principle, or the universal equality of inertial and passive-gravitational mass): the trajectory of a test body in free fall depends only on its position and initial speed, but not on any of its material properties. A simplified version of this is embodied in Einstein's elevator experiment, illustrated in the figure on the right: for an observer in an enclosed room, it is impossible to decide, by mapping the trajectory of bodies such as a dropped ball, whether the room is stationary in a gravitational field and the ball accelerating, or in free space aboard a rocket that is accelerating at a rate equal to that of the gravitational field versus the ball which upon release has nil acceleration.

Given the universality of free fall, there is no observable distinction between inertial motion and motion under the influence of the gravitational force. This suggests the definition of a new class of inertial motion, namely that of objects in free fall under the influence of gravity. This new class of preferred motions, too, defines a geometry of space and time—in mathematical terms, it is the geodesic motion associated with a specific connection which depends on the gradient of the gravitational potential. Space, in this construction, still has the ordinary Euclidean geometry. However, spacetime as a whole is more complicated. As can be shown using simple thought experiments following the free-fall trajectories of different test particles, the result of transporting spacetime vectors that can denote a particle's velocity (time-like vectors) will vary with the particle's trajectory; mathematically speaking, the Newtonian connection is not integrable. From this, one can deduce that spacetime is curved. The resulting Newton–Cartan theory is a geometric formulation of Newtonian gravity using only covariant concepts, i.e. a description which is valid in any desired coordinate system. In this geometric description, tidal effects—the relative acceleration of bodies in free fall—are related to the derivative of the connection, showing how the modified geometry is caused by the presence of mass.

Relativistic generalization 

As intriguing as geometric Newtonian gravity may be, its basis, classical mechanics, is merely a limiting case of (special) relativistic mechanics. In the language of symmetry: where gravity can be neglected, physics is Lorentz invariant as in special relativity rather than Galilei invariant as in classical mechanics. (The defining symmetry of special relativity is the Poincaré group, which includes translations, rotations, boosts and reflections.) The differences between the two become significant when dealing with speeds approaching the speed of light, and with high-energy phenomena.

With Lorentz symmetry, additional structures come into play. They are defined by the set of light cones (see image). The light-cones define a causal structure: for each event , there is a set of events that can, in principle, either influence or be influenced by  via signals or interactions that do not need to travel faster than light (such as event  in the image), and a set of events for which such an influence is impossible (such as event  in the image). These sets are observer-independent. In conjunction with the world-lines of freely falling particles, the light-cones can be used to reconstruct the spacetime's semi-Riemannian metric, at least up to a positive scalar factor. In mathematical terms, this defines a conformal structure or conformal geometry.

Special relativity is defined in the absence of gravity. For practical applications, it is a suitable model whenever gravity can be neglected. Bringing gravity into play, and assuming the universality of free fall motion, an analogous reasoning as in the previous section applies: there are no global inertial frames. Instead there are approximate inertial frames moving alongside freely falling particles. Translated into the language of spacetime: the straight time-like lines that define a gravity-free inertial frame are deformed to lines that are curved relative to each other, suggesting that the inclusion of gravity necessitates a change in spacetime geometry.

A priori, it is not clear whether the new local frames in free fall coincide with the reference frames in which the laws of special relativity hold—that theory is based on the propagation of light, and thus on electromagnetism, which could have a different set of preferred frames. But using different assumptions about the special-relativistic frames (such as their being earth-fixed, or in free fall), one can derive different predictions for the gravitational redshift, that is, the way in which the frequency of light shifts as the light propagates through a gravitational field (cf. below). The actual measurements show that free-falling frames are the ones in which light propagates as it does in special relativity. The generalization of this statement, namely that the laws of special relativity hold to good approximation in freely falling (and non-rotating) reference frames, is known as the Einstein equivalence principle, a crucial guiding principle for generalizing special-relativistic physics to include gravity.

The same experimental data shows that time as measured by clocks in a gravitational field—proper time, to give the technical term—does not follow the rules of special relativity. In the language of spacetime geometry, it is not measured by the Minkowski metric. As in the Newtonian case, this is suggestive of a more general geometry. At small scales, all reference frames that are in free fall are equivalent, and approximately Minkowskian. Consequently, we are now dealing with a curved generalization of Minkowski space. The metric tensor that defines the geometry—in particular, how lengths and angles are measured—is not the Minkowski metric of special relativity, it is a generalization known as a semi- or pseudo-Riemannian metric. Furthermore, each Riemannian metric is naturally associated with one particular kind of connection, the Levi-Civita connection, and this is, in fact, the connection that satisfies the equivalence principle and makes space locally Minkowskian (that is, in suitable locally inertial coordinates, the metric is Minkowskian, and its first partial derivatives and the connection coefficients vanish).

Einstein's equations 

Having formulated the relativistic, geometric version of the effects of gravity, the question of gravity's source remains. In Newtonian gravity, the source is mass. In special relativity, mass turns out to be part of a more general quantity called the energy–momentum tensor, which includes both energy and momentum densities as well as stress: pressure and shear. Using the equivalence principle, this tensor is readily generalized to curved spacetime. Drawing further upon the analogy with geometric Newtonian gravity, it is natural to assume that the field equation for gravity relates this tensor and the Ricci tensor, which describes a particular class of tidal effects: the change in volume for a small cloud of test particles that are initially at rest, and then fall freely. In special relativity, conservation of energy–momentum corresponds to the statement that the energy–momentum tensor is divergence-free. This formula, too, is readily generalized to curved spacetime by replacing partial derivatives with their curved-manifold counterparts, covariant derivatives studied in differential geometry. With this additional condition—the covariant divergence of the energy–momentum tensor, and hence of whatever is on the other side of the equation, is zero—the simplest set of equations are what are called Einstein's (field) equations:

On the left-hand side is the Einstein tensor, which is symmetric and a specific divergence-free combination of the Ricci tensor  and the metric. In particular,

is the curvature scalar. The Ricci tensor itself is related to the more general Riemann curvature tensor as

On the right-hand side,  is the energy–momentum tensor. All tensors are written in abstract index notation. Matching the theory's prediction to observational results for planetary orbits or, equivalently, assuring that the weak-gravity, low-speed limit is Newtonian mechanics, the proportionality constant is found to be , where  is the gravitational constant and  the speed of light in vacuum. When there is no matter present, so that the energy–momentum tensor vanishes, the results are the vacuum Einstein equations,

In general relativity, the world line of a particle free from all external, non-gravitational force is a particular type of geodesic in curved spacetime. In other words, a freely moving or falling particle always moves along a geodesic.

The geodesic equation is:

The quantity on the left-hand-side of this equation is the acceleration of a particle, and so this equation is analogous to Newton's laws of motion which likewise provide formulae for the acceleration of a particle. This equation of motion employs the Einstein notation, meaning that repeated indices are summed (i.e. from zero to three). The Christoffel symbols are functions of the four spacetime coordinates, and so are independent of the velocity or acceleration or other characteristics of a test particle whose motion is described by the geodesic equation.

Total force in general relativity 

In general relativity, the effective gravitational potential energy of an object of mass m revolving around a massive central body M is given by

A conservative total force can then be obtained as

where L is the angular momentum. The first term represents the Newton's force of gravity, which is described by the inverse-square law. The second term represents the centrifugal force in the circular motion. The third term represents the relativistic effect.

Alternatives to general relativity 

There are alternatives to general relativity built upon the same premises, which include additional rules and/or constraints, leading to different field equations. Examples are Whitehead's theory, Brans–Dicke theory, teleparallelism, f(R) gravity and Einstein–Cartan theory.

Definition and basic applications 

The derivation outlined in the previous section contains all the information needed to define general relativity, describe its key properties, and address a question of crucial importance in physics, namely how the theory can be used for model-building.

Definition and basic properties 
General relativity is a metric theory of gravitation. At its core are Einstein's equations, which describe the relation between the geometry of a four-dimensional pseudo-Riemannian manifold representing spacetime, and the energy–momentum contained in that spacetime. Phenomena that in classical mechanics are ascribed to the action of the force of gravity (such as free-fall, orbital motion, and spacecraft trajectories), correspond to inertial motion within a curved geometry of spacetime in general relativity; there is no gravitational force deflecting objects from their natural, straight paths. Instead, gravity corresponds to changes in the properties of space and time, which in turn changes the straightest-possible paths that objects will naturally follow. The curvature is, in turn, caused by the energy–momentum of matter. Paraphrasing the relativist John Archibald Wheeler, spacetime tells matter how to move; matter tells spacetime how to curve.

While general relativity replaces the scalar gravitational potential of classical physics by a symmetric rank-two tensor, the latter reduces to the former in certain limiting cases. For weak gravitational fields and slow speed relative to the speed of light, the theory's predictions converge on those of Newton's law of universal gravitation.

As it is constructed using tensors, general relativity exhibits general covariance: its laws—and further laws formulated within the general relativistic framework—take on the same form in all coordinate systems. Furthermore, the theory does not contain any invariant geometric background structures, i.e. it is background independent. It thus satisfies a more stringent general principle of relativity, namely that the laws of physics are the same for all observers. Locally, as expressed in the equivalence principle, spacetime is Minkowskian, and the laws of physics exhibit local Lorentz invariance.

Model-building 
The core concept of general-relativistic model-building is that of a solution of Einstein's equations. Given both Einstein's equations and suitable equations for the properties of matter, such a solution consists of a specific semi-Riemannian manifold (usually defined by giving the metric in specific coordinates), and specific matter fields defined on that manifold. Matter and geometry must satisfy Einstein's equations, so in particular, the matter's energy–momentum tensor must be divergence-free. The matter must, of course, also satisfy whatever additional equations were imposed on its properties. In short, such a solution is a model universe that satisfies the laws of general relativity, and possibly additional laws governing whatever matter might be present.

Einstein's equations are nonlinear partial differential equations and, as such, difficult to solve exactly. Nevertheless, a number of exact solutions are known, although only a few have direct physical applications. The best-known exact solutions, and also those most interesting from a physics point of view, are the Schwarzschild solution, the Reissner–Nordström solution and the Kerr metric, each corresponding to a certain type of black hole in an otherwise empty universe, and the Friedmann–Lemaître–Robertson–Walker and de Sitter universes, each describing an expanding cosmos. Exact solutions of great theoretical interest include the Gödel universe (which opens up the intriguing possibility of time travel in curved spacetimes), the Taub–NUT solution (a model universe that is homogeneous, but anisotropic), and anti-de Sitter space (which has recently come to prominence in the context of what is called the Maldacena conjecture).

Given the difficulty of finding exact solutions, Einstein's field equations are also solved frequently by numerical integration on a computer, or by considering small perturbations of exact solutions. In the field of numerical relativity, powerful computers are employed to simulate the geometry of spacetime and to solve Einstein's equations for interesting situations such as two colliding black holes. In principle, such methods may be applied to any system, given sufficient computer resources, and may address fundamental questions such as naked singularities. Approximate solutions may also be found by perturbation theories such as linearized gravity and its generalization, the post-Newtonian expansion, both of which were developed by Einstein. The latter provides a systematic approach to solving for the geometry of a spacetime that contains a distribution of matter that moves slowly compared with the speed of light. The expansion involves a series of terms; the first terms represent Newtonian gravity, whereas the later terms represent ever smaller corrections to Newton's theory due to general relativity. An extension of this expansion is the parametrized post-Newtonian (PPN) formalism, which allows quantitative comparisons between the predictions of general relativity and alternative theories.

Consequences of Einstein's theory 
General relativity has a number of physical consequences. Some follow directly from the theory's axioms, whereas others have become clear only in the course of many years of research that followed Einstein's initial publication.

Gravitational time dilation and frequency shift 

Assuming that the equivalence principle holds, gravity influences the passage of time. Light sent down into a gravity well is blueshifted, whereas light sent in the opposite direction (i.e., climbing out of the gravity well) is redshifted; collectively, these two effects are known as the gravitational frequency shift. More generally, processes close to a massive body run more slowly when compared with processes taking place farther away; this effect is known as gravitational time dilation.

Gravitational redshift has been measured in the laboratory and using astronomical observations. Gravitational time dilation in the Earth's gravitational field has been measured numerous times using atomic clocks, while ongoing validation is provided as a side effect of the operation of the Global Positioning System (GPS). Tests in stronger gravitational fields are provided by the observation of binary pulsars. All results are in agreement with general relativity. However, at the current level of accuracy, these observations cannot distinguish between general relativity and other theories in which the equivalence principle is valid.

Light deflection and gravitational time delay 

General relativity predicts that the path of light will follow the curvature of spacetime as it passes near a star. This effect was initially confirmed by observing the light of stars or distant quasars being deflected as it passes the Sun.

This and related predictions follow from the fact that light follows what is called a light-like or null geodesic—a generalization of the straight lines along which light travels in classical physics. Such geodesics are the generalization of the invariance of lightspeed in special relativity. As one examines suitable model spacetimes (either the exterior Schwarzschild solution or, for more than a single mass, the post-Newtonian expansion), several effects of gravity on light propagation emerge. Although the bending of light can also be derived by extending the universality of free fall to light, the angle of deflection resulting from such calculations is only half the value given by general relativity.

Closely related to light deflection is the gravitational time delay (or Shapiro delay), the phenomenon that light signals take longer to move through a gravitational field than they would in the absence of that field. There have been numerous successful tests of this prediction. In the parameterized post-Newtonian formalism (PPN), measurements of both the deflection of light and the gravitational time delay determine a parameter called γ, which encodes the influence of gravity on the geometry of space.

Gravitational waves 

Predicted in 1916 by Albert Einstein, there are gravitational waves: ripples in the metric of spacetime that propagate at the speed of light. These are one of several analogies between weak-field gravity and electromagnetism in that, they are analogous to electromagnetic waves. On 11 February 2016, the Advanced LIGO team announced that they had directly detected gravitational waves from a pair of black holes merging.

The simplest type of such a wave can be visualized by its action on a ring of freely floating particles. A sine wave propagating through such a ring towards the reader distorts the ring in a characteristic, rhythmic fashion (animated image to the right). Since Einstein's equations are non-linear, arbitrarily strong gravitational waves do not obey linear superposition, making their description difficult. Data analysis methods routinely make use of the fact that these linearized waves can be Fourier decomposed.

Some exact solutions describe gravitational waves without any approximation, e.g., a wave train traveling through empty space or Gowdy universes, varieties of an expanding cosmos filled with gravitational waves. But for gravitational waves produced in astrophysically relevant situations, such as the merger of two black holes, numerical methods are presently the only way to construct appropriate models.

Orbital effects and the relativity of direction 

General relativity differs from classical mechanics in a number of predictions concerning orbiting bodies. It predicts an overall rotation (precession) of planetary orbits, as well as orbital decay caused by the emission of gravitational waves and effects related to the relativity of direction.

Precession of apsides 

In general relativity, the apsides of any orbit (the point of the orbiting body's closest approach to the system's center of mass) will precess; the orbit is not an ellipse, but akin to an ellipse that rotates on its focus, resulting in a rose curve-like shape (see image). Einstein first derived this result by using an approximate metric representing the Newtonian limit and treating the orbiting body as a test particle. For him, the fact that his theory gave a straightforward explanation of Mercury's anomalous perihelion shift, discovered earlier by Urbain Le Verrier in 1859, was important evidence that he had at last identified the correct form of the gravitational field equations.

The effect can also be derived by using either the exact Schwarzschild metric (describing spacetime around a spherical mass) or the much more general post-Newtonian formalism. It is due to the influence of gravity on the geometry of space and to the contribution of self-energy to a body's gravity (encoded in the nonlinearity of Einstein's equations). Relativistic precession has been observed for all planets that allow for accurate precession measurements (Mercury, Venus, and Earth), as well as in binary pulsar systems, where it is larger by five orders of magnitude.

In general relativity the perihelion shift , expressed in radians per revolution, is approximately given by

where:
 is the semi-major axis
 is the orbital period
 is the speed of light in vacuum
 is the orbital eccentricity

Orbital decay 

According to general relativity, a binary system will emit gravitational waves, thereby losing energy. Due to this loss, the distance between the two orbiting bodies decreases, and so does their orbital period. Within the Solar System or for ordinary double stars, the effect is too small to be observable. This is not the case for a close binary pulsar, a system of two orbiting neutron stars, one of which is a pulsar: from the pulsar, observers on Earth receive a regular series of radio pulses that can serve as a highly accurate clock, which allows precise measurements of the orbital period. Because neutron stars are immensely compact, significant amounts of energy are emitted in the form of gravitational radiation.

The first observation of a decrease in orbital period due to the emission of gravitational waves was made by Hulse and Taylor, using the binary pulsar PSR1913+16 they had discovered in 1974. This was the first detection of gravitational waves, albeit indirect, for which they were awarded the 1993 Nobel Prize in physics. Since then, several other binary pulsars have been found, in particular the double pulsar PSR J0737−3039, where both stars are pulsars and which was last reported to also be in agreement with general relativity in 2021 after 16 years of observations.

Geodetic precession and frame-dragging 

Several relativistic effects are directly related to the relativity of direction. One is geodetic precession: the axis direction of a gyroscope in free fall in curved spacetime will change when compared, for instance, with the direction of light received from distant stars—even though such a gyroscope represents the way of keeping a direction as stable as possible ("parallel transport"). For the Moon–Earth system, this effect has been measured with the help of lunar laser ranging. More recently, it has been measured for test masses aboard the satellite Gravity Probe B to a precision of better than 0.3%.

Near a rotating mass, there are gravitomagnetic or frame-dragging effects. A distant observer will determine that objects close to the mass get "dragged around". This is most extreme for rotating black holes where, for any object entering a zone known as the ergosphere, rotation is inevitable. Such effects can again be tested through their influence on the orientation of gyroscopes in free fall. Somewhat controversial tests have been performed using the LAGEOS satellites, confirming the relativistic prediction. Also the Mars Global Surveyor probe around Mars has been used.

Interpretations

Neo-Lorentzian Interpretation 
Examples of prominent physicists who support neo-Lorentzian explanations of general relativity are Franco Selleri and Antony Valentini.

Astrophysical applications

Gravitational lensing 

The deflection of light by gravity is responsible for a new class of astronomical phenomena. If a massive object is situated between the astronomer and a distant target object with appropriate mass and relative distances, the astronomer will see multiple distorted images of the target. Such effects are known as gravitational lensing. Depending on the configuration, scale, and mass distribution, there can be two or more images, a bright ring known as an Einstein ring, or partial rings called arcs.
The earliest example was discovered in 1979; since then, more than a hundred gravitational lenses have been observed. Even if the multiple images are too close to each other to be resolved, the effect can still be measured, e.g., as an overall brightening of the target object; a number of such "microlensing events" have been observed.

Gravitational lensing has developed into a tool of observational astronomy. It is used to detect the presence and distribution of dark matter, provide a "natural telescope" for observing distant galaxies, and to obtain an independent estimate of the Hubble constant. Statistical evaluations of lensing data provide valuable insight into the structural evolution of galaxies.

Gravitational-wave astronomy 

Observations of binary pulsars provide strong indirect evidence for the existence of gravitational waves (see Orbital decay, above). Detection of these waves is a major goal of current relativity-related research. Several land-based gravitational wave detectors are currently in operation, most notably the interferometric detectors GEO 600, LIGO (two detectors), TAMA 300 and VIRGO. Various pulsar timing arrays are using millisecond pulsars to detect gravitational waves in the 10−9 to 10−6 hertz frequency range, which originate from binary supermassive blackholes. A European space-based detector, eLISA / NGO, is currently under development, with a precursor mission (LISA Pathfinder) having launched in December 2015.

Observations of gravitational waves promise to complement observations in the electromagnetic spectrum. They are expected to yield information about black holes and other dense objects such as neutron stars and white dwarfs, about certain kinds of supernova implosions, and about processes in the very early universe, including the signature of certain types of hypothetical cosmic string. In February 2016, the Advanced LIGO team announced that they had detected gravitational waves from a black hole merger.

Black holes and other compact objects 

Whenever the ratio of an object's mass to its radius becomes sufficiently large, general relativity predicts the formation of a black hole, a region of space from which nothing, not even light, can escape. In the currently accepted models of stellar evolution, neutron stars of around 1.4 solar masses, and stellar black holes with a few to a few dozen solar masses, are thought to be the final state for the evolution of massive stars. Usually a galaxy has one supermassive black hole with a few million to a few billion solar masses in its center, and its presence is thought to have played an important role in the formation of the galaxy and larger cosmic structures.

Astronomically, the most important property of compact objects is that they provide a supremely efficient mechanism for converting gravitational energy into electromagnetic radiation. Accretion, the falling of dust or gaseous matter onto stellar or supermassive black holes, is thought to be responsible for some spectacularly luminous astronomical objects, notably diverse kinds of active galactic nuclei on galactic scales and stellar-size objects such as microquasars. In particular, accretion can lead to relativistic jets, focused beams of highly energetic particles that are being flung into space at almost light speed.
General relativity plays a central role in modelling all these phenomena, and observations provide strong evidence for the existence of black holes with the properties predicted by the theory.

Black holes are also sought-after targets in the search for gravitational waves (cf. Gravitational waves, above). Merging black hole binaries should lead to some of the strongest gravitational wave signals reaching detectors here on Earth, and the phase directly before the merger ("chirp") could be used as a "standard candle" to deduce the distance to the merger events–and hence serve as a probe of cosmic expansion at large distances. The gravitational waves produced as a stellar black hole plunges into a supermassive one should provide direct information about the supermassive black hole's geometry.

Cosmology 

The current models of cosmology are based on Einstein's field equations, which include the cosmological constant  since it has important influence on the large-scale dynamics of the cosmos,

where  is the spacetime metric. Isotropic and homogeneous solutions of these enhanced equations, the Friedmann–Lemaître–Robertson–Walker solutions, allow physicists to model a universe that has evolved over the past 14 billion years from a hot, early Big Bang phase. Once a small number of parameters (for example the universe's mean matter density) have been fixed by astronomical observation, further observational data can be used to put the models to the test. Predictions, all successful, include the initial abundance of chemical elements formed in a period of primordial nucleosynthesis, the large-scale structure of the universe, and the existence and properties of a "thermal echo" from the early cosmos, the cosmic background radiation.

Astronomical observations of the cosmological expansion rate allow the total amount of matter in the universe to be estimated, although the nature of that matter remains mysterious in part. About 90% of all matter appears to be dark matter, which has mass (or, equivalently, gravitational influence), but does not interact electromagnetically and, hence, cannot be observed directly. There is no generally accepted description of this new kind of matter, within the framework of known particle physics or otherwise. Observational evidence from redshift surveys of distant supernovae and measurements of the cosmic background radiation also show that the evolution of our universe is significantly influenced by a cosmological constant resulting in an acceleration of cosmic expansion or, equivalently, by a form of energy with an unusual equation of state, known as dark energy, the nature of which remains unclear.

An inflationary phase, an additional phase of strongly accelerated expansion at cosmic times of around 10−33 seconds, was hypothesized in 1980 to account for several puzzling observations that were unexplained by classical cosmological models, such as the nearly perfect homogeneity of the cosmic background radiation. Recent measurements of the cosmic background radiation have resulted in the first evidence for this scenario. However, there is a bewildering variety of possible inflationary scenarios, which cannot be restricted by current observations. An even larger question is the physics of the earliest universe, prior to the inflationary phase and close to where the classical models predict the big bang singularity. An authoritative answer would require a complete theory of quantum gravity, which has not yet been developed (cf. the section on quantum gravity, below).

Exotic solutions: time travel, warp drives 
Kurt Gödel showed that solutions to Einstein's equations exist that contain closed timelike curves (CTCs), which allow for loops in time. The solutions require extreme physical conditions unlikely ever to occur in practice, and it remains an open question whether further laws of physics will eliminate them completely. Since then, other—similarly impractical—GR solutions containing CTCs have been found, such as the Tipler cylinder and traversable wormholes. Stephen Hawking introduced chronology protection conjecture, which is an assumption beyond those of standard general relativity to prevent time travel.

Some exact solutions in general relativity such as Alcubierre drive present examples of warp drive but these solutions requires exotic matter distribution, and generally suffers from semiclassical instability.

Advanced concepts

Asymptotic symmetries 

The spacetime symmetry group for special relativity is the Poincaré group, which is a ten-dimensional group of three Lorentz boosts, three rotations, and four spacetime translations. It is logical to ask what symmetries if any might apply in General Relativity. A tractable case might be to consider the symmetries of spacetime as seen by observers located far away from all sources of the gravitational field. The naive expectation for asymptotically flat spacetime symmetries might be simply to extend and reproduce the symmetries of flat spacetime of special relativity, viz., the Poincaré group.

In 1962 Hermann Bondi, M. G. van der Burg, A. W. Metzner and Rainer K. Sachs addressed this asymptotic symmetry problem in order to investigate the flow of energy at infinity due to propagating gravitational waves. Their first step was to decide on some physically sensible boundary conditions to place on the gravitational field at light-like infinity to characterize what it means to say a metric is asymptotically flat, making no a priori assumptions about the nature of the asymptotic symmetry group—not even the assumption that such a group exists. Then after designing what they considered to be the most sensible boundary conditions, they investigated the nature of the resulting asymptotic symmetry transformations that leave invariant the form of the boundary conditions appropriate for asymptotically flat gravitational fields. What they found was that the asymptotic symmetry transformations actually do form a group and the structure of this group does not depend on the particular gravitational field that happens to be present. This means that, as expected, one can separate the kinematics of spacetime from the dynamics of the gravitational field at least at spatial infinity. The puzzling surprise in 1962 was their discovery of a rich infinite-dimensional group (the so-called BMS group) as the asymptotic symmetry group, instead of the finite-dimensional Poincaré group, which is a subgroup of the BMS group. Not only are the Lorentz transformations asymptotic symmetry transformations, there are also additional transformations that are not Lorentz transformations but are asymptotic symmetry transformations. In fact, they found an additional infinity of transformation generators known as supertranslations. This implies the conclusion that General Relativity (GR) does not reduce to special relativity in the case of weak fields at long distances. It turns out that the BMS symmetry, suitably modified, could be seen as a restatement of the universal soft graviton theorem in quantum field theory (QFT), which relates universal infrared (soft) QFT with GR asymptotic spacetime symmetries.

Causal structure and global geometry 

In general relativity, no material body can catch up with or overtake a light pulse. No influence from an event A can reach any other location X before light sent out at A to X. In consequence, an exploration of all light worldlines (null geodesics) yields key information about the spacetime's causal structure. This structure can be displayed using Penrose–Carter diagrams in which infinitely large regions of space and infinite time intervals are shrunk ("compactified") so as to fit onto a finite map, while light still travels along diagonals as in standard spacetime diagrams.

Aware of the importance of causal structure, Roger Penrose and others developed what is known as global geometry. In global geometry, the object of study is not one particular solution (or family of solutions) to Einstein's equations. Rather, relations that hold true for all geodesics, such as the Raychaudhuri equation, and additional non-specific assumptions about the nature of matter (usually in the form of energy conditions) are used to derive general results.

Horizons 

Using global geometry, some spacetimes can be shown to contain boundaries called horizons, which demarcate one region from the rest of spacetime. The best-known examples are black holes: if mass is compressed into a sufficiently compact region of space (as specified in the hoop conjecture, the relevant length scale is the Schwarzschild radius), no light from inside can escape to the outside. Since no object can overtake a light pulse, all interior matter is imprisoned as well. Passage from the exterior to the interior is still possible, showing that the boundary, the black hole's horizon, is not a physical barrier.

Early studies of black holes relied on explicit solutions of Einstein's equations, notably the spherically symmetric Schwarzschild solution (used to describe a static black hole) and the axisymmetric Kerr solution (used to describe a rotating, stationary black hole, and introducing interesting features such as the ergosphere). Using global geometry, later studies have revealed more general properties of black holes. With time they become rather simple objects characterized by eleven parameters specifying: electric charge, mass–energy, linear momentum, angular momentum, and location at a specified time. This is stated by the black hole uniqueness theorem: "black holes have no hair", that is, no distinguishing marks like the hairstyles of humans. Irrespective of the complexity of a gravitating object collapsing to form a black hole, the object that results (having emitted gravitational waves) is very simple.

Even more remarkably, there is a general set of laws known as black hole mechanics, which is analogous to the laws of thermodynamics. For instance, by the second law of black hole mechanics, the area of the event horizon of a general black hole will never decrease with time, analogous to the entropy of a thermodynamic system. This limits the energy that can be extracted by classical means from a rotating black hole (e.g. by the Penrose process). There is strong evidence that the laws of black hole mechanics are, in fact, a subset of the laws of thermodynamics, and that the black hole area is proportional to its entropy. This leads to a modification of the original laws of black hole mechanics: for instance, as the second law of black hole mechanics becomes part of the second law of thermodynamics, it is possible for black hole area to decrease—as long as other processes ensure that, overall, entropy increases. As thermodynamical objects with non-zero temperature, black holes should emit thermal radiation. Semi-classical calculations indicate that indeed they do, with the surface gravity playing the role of temperature in Planck's law. This radiation is known as Hawking radiation (cf. the quantum theory section, below).

There are other types of horizons. In an expanding universe, an observer may find that some regions of the past cannot be observed ("particle horizon"), and some regions of the future cannot be influenced (event horizon). Even in flat Minkowski space, when described by an accelerated observer (Rindler space), there will be horizons associated with a semi-classical radiation known as Unruh radiation.

Singularities 

Another general feature of general relativity is the appearance of spacetime boundaries known as singularities. Spacetime can be explored by following up on timelike and lightlike geodesics—all possible ways that light and particles in free fall can travel. But some solutions of Einstein's equations have "ragged edges"—regions known as spacetime singularities, where the paths of light and falling particles come to an abrupt end, and geometry becomes ill-defined. In the more interesting cases, these are "curvature singularities", where geometrical quantities characterizing spacetime curvature, such as the Ricci scalar, take on infinite values. Well-known examples of spacetimes with future singularities—where worldlines end—are the Schwarzschild solution, which describes a singularity inside an eternal static black hole, or the Kerr solution with its ring-shaped singularity inside an eternal rotating black hole. The Friedmann–Lemaître–Robertson–Walker solutions and other spacetimes describing universes have past singularities on which worldlines begin, namely Big Bang singularities, and some have future singularities (Big Crunch) as well.

Given that these examples are all highly symmetric—and thus simplified—it is tempting to conclude that the occurrence of singularities is an artifact of idealization. The famous singularity theorems, proved using the methods of global geometry, say otherwise: singularities are a generic feature of general relativity, and unavoidable once the collapse of an object with realistic matter properties has proceeded beyond a certain stage and also at the beginning of a wide class of expanding universes. However, the theorems say little about the properties of singularities, and much of current research is devoted to characterizing these entities' generic structure (hypothesized e.g. by the BKL conjecture). The cosmic censorship hypothesis states that all realistic future singularities (no perfect symmetries, matter with realistic properties) are safely hidden away behind a horizon, and thus invisible to all distant observers. While no formal proof yet exists, numerical simulations offer supporting evidence of its validity.

Evolution equations 

Each solution of Einstein's equation encompasses the whole history of a universe—it is not just some snapshot of how things are, but a whole, possibly matter-filled, spacetime. It describes the state of matter and geometry everywhere and at every moment in that particular universe. Due to its general covariance, Einstein's theory is not sufficient by itself to determine the time evolution of the metric tensor. It must be combined with a coordinate condition, which is analogous to gauge fixing in other field theories.

To understand Einstein's equations as partial differential equations, it is helpful to formulate them in a way that describes the evolution of the universe over time. This is done in "3+1" formulations, where spacetime is split into three space dimensions and one time dimension. The best-known example is the ADM formalism. These decompositions show that the spacetime evolution equations of general relativity are well-behaved: solutions always exist, and are uniquely defined, once suitable initial conditions have been specified. Such formulations of Einstein's field equations are the basis of numerical relativity.

Global and quasi-local quantities 

The notion of evolution equations is intimately tied in with another aspect of general relativistic physics. In Einstein's theory, it turns out to be impossible to find a general definition for a seemingly simple property such as a system's total mass (or energy). The main reason is that the gravitational field—like any physical field—must be ascribed a certain energy, but that it proves to be fundamentally impossible to localize that energy.

Nevertheless, there are possibilities to define a system's total mass, either using a hypothetical "infinitely distant observer" (ADM mass) or suitable symmetries (Komar mass). If one excludes from the system's total mass the energy being carried away to infinity by gravitational waves, the result is the Bondi mass at null infinity. Just as in classical physics, it can be shown that these masses are positive. Corresponding global definitions exist for momentum and angular momentum. There have also been a number of attempts to define quasi-local quantities, such as the mass of an isolated system formulated using only quantities defined within a finite region of space containing that system. The hope is to obtain a quantity useful for general statements about isolated systems, such as a more precise formulation of the hoop conjecture.

Relationship with quantum theory 
If general relativity were considered to be one of the two pillars of modern physics, then quantum theory, the basis of understanding matter from elementary particles to solid-state physics, would be the other. However, how to reconcile quantum theory with general relativity is still an open question.

Quantum field theory in curved spacetime 

Ordinary quantum field theories, which form the basis of modern elementary particle physics, are defined in flat Minkowski space, which is an excellent approximation when it comes to describing the behavior of microscopic particles in weak gravitational fields like those found on Earth. In order to describe situations in which gravity is strong enough to influence (quantum) matter, yet not strong enough to require quantization itself, physicists have formulated quantum field theories in curved spacetime. These theories rely on general relativity to describe a curved background spacetime, and define a generalized quantum field theory to describe the behavior of quantum matter within that spacetime. Using this formalism, it can be shown that black holes emit a blackbody spectrum of particles known as Hawking radiation leading to the possibility that they evaporate over time. As briefly mentioned above, this radiation plays an important role for the thermodynamics of black holes.

Quantum gravity 

The demand for consistency between a quantum description of matter and a geometric description of spacetime, as well as the appearance of singularities (where curvature length scales become microscopic), indicate the need for a full theory of quantum gravity: for an adequate description of the interior of black holes, and of the very early universe, a theory is required in which gravity and the associated geometry of spacetime are described in the language of quantum physics. Despite major efforts, no complete and consistent theory of quantum gravity is currently known, even though a number of promising candidates exist.

Attempts to generalize ordinary quantum field theories, used in elementary particle physics to describe fundamental interactions, so as to include gravity have led to serious problems. Some have argued that at low energies, this approach proves successful, in that it results in an acceptable effective (quantum) field theory of gravity. At very high energies, however, the perturbative results are badly divergent and lead to models devoid of predictive power ("perturbative non-renormalizability").

One attempt to overcome these limitations is string theory, a quantum theory not of point particles, but of minute one-dimensional extended objects. The theory promises to be a unified description of all particles and interactions, including gravity; the price to pay is unusual features such as six extra dimensions of space in addition to the usual three. In what is called the second superstring revolution, it was conjectured that both string theory and a unification of general relativity and supersymmetry known as supergravity form part of a hypothesized eleven-dimensional model known as M-theory, which would constitute a uniquely defined and consistent theory of quantum gravity.

Another approach starts with the canonical quantization procedures of quantum theory. Using the initial-value-formulation of general relativity (cf. evolution equations above), the result is the Wheeler–deWitt equation (an analogue of the Schrödinger equation) which, regrettably, turns out to be ill-defined without a proper ultraviolet (lattice) cutoff. However, with the introduction of what are now known as Ashtekar variables, this leads to a promising model known as loop quantum gravity. Space is represented by a web-like structure called a spin network, evolving over time in discrete steps.

Depending on which features of general relativity and quantum theory are accepted unchanged, and on what level changes are introduced, there are numerous other attempts to arrive at a viable theory of quantum gravity, some examples being the lattice theory of gravity based on the Feynman Path Integral approach and Regge calculus, dynamical triangulations, causal sets, twistor models or the path integral based models of quantum cosmology.

All candidate theories still have major formal and conceptual problems to overcome. They also face the common problem that, as yet, there is no way to put quantum gravity predictions to experimental tests (and thus to decide between the candidates where their predictions vary), although there is hope for this to change as future data from cosmological observations and particle physics experiments becomes available.

Current status 

General relativity has emerged as a highly successful model of gravitation and cosmology, which has so far passed many unambiguous observational and experimental tests. However, there are strong indications that the theory is incomplete. The problem of quantum gravity and the question of the reality of spacetime singularities remain open. Observational data that is taken as evidence for dark energy and dark matter could indicate the need for new physics. Even taken as is, general relativity is rich with possibilities for further exploration. Mathematical relativists seek to understand the nature of singularities and the fundamental properties of Einstein's equations, while numerical relativists run increasingly powerful computer simulations (such as those describing merging black holes). In February 2016, it was announced that the existence of gravitational waves was directly detected by the Advanced LIGO team on 14 September 2015. A century after its introduction, general relativity remains a highly active area of research.

See also 

Alcubierre drive (warp drive)
Alternatives to general relativity
Center of mass (relativistic)
Contributors to general relativity
Derivations of the Lorentz transformations
Ehrenfest paradox
Einstein–Hilbert action
Einstein's thought experiments
General relativity priority dispute
Introduction to the mathematics of general relativity
Nordström's theory of gravitation
Ricci calculus
Tests of general relativity
Timeline of gravitational physics and relativity
Two-body problem in general relativity
Weak Gravity Conjecture

References

Bibliography 

 
 
 
 
 
 
 
 
 
 
 
 
 
 
 
 
 
 
 
 
 
 
 
 
 ; original paper in Russian: 
 
 
 
 
 
 
 
 
 
 
 
 

 
 
 
 
 
 
 
 
 
 
 
 
 
 
 
 
 
 
 
 
 
 
 
 
 
 
 
  See also English translation at Einstein Papers Project

  See also English translation at Einstein Papers Project
  See also English translation at Einstein Papers Project

Further reading

Popular books

Beginning undergraduate textbooks

Advanced undergraduate textbooks

Graduate textbooks

Specialists' books

Journal articles 
 See also English translation at Einstein Papers Project

External links 

Einstein Online  – Articles on a variety of aspects of relativistic physics for a general audience; hosted by the Max Planck Institute for Gravitational Physics
GEO600 home page, the official website of the GEO600 project.
LIGO Laboratory
NCSA Spacetime Wrinkles – produced by the numerical relativity group at the NCSA, with an elementary introduction to general relativity

  (lecture by Leonard Susskind recorded 22 September 2008 at Stanford University).
Series of lectures on General Relativity given in 2006 at the Institut Henri Poincaré (introductory/advanced).
General Relativity Tutorials by John Baez.

The Feynman Lectures on Physics Vol. II Ch. 42: Curved Space

 
Concepts in astronomy
Albert Einstein
1915 in science
Articles containing video clips